Events in the year 1741 in Norway.

Incumbents
Monarch: Christian VI

Events
13 January - Conventicle Act of 1741 is introduced.

Arts and literature

Births

 22 April  Martha Wærn, philanthropist  (died 1812).
9 May – Hugo Fredrik Hjorthøy, priest and topographic writer (died 1812).
13 May – Ingeborg Akeleye, noblewoman (died 1800).

Deaths

See also

References